Thambirajah Thangavadivel (born 28 February 1941) is a Sri Lankan Tamil civil servant, politician and former Member of Parliament.

Thangavadivel was born on 28 February 1941. He is a Hindu and a land use officer (soil scientist). He is known as London Muruga and is from Araipattai, Batticaloa District.

Thangavadivel contested the 2001 parliamentary election as one of the Tamil National Alliance's candidates in Batticaloa District and was elected to Parliament.

References

1941 births
Living people
Members of the 12th Parliament of Sri Lanka
People from Eastern Province, Sri Lanka
Sri Lankan Hindus
Sri Lankan Tamil civil servants
Sri Lankan Tamil politicians
Tamil Eelam Liberation Organization politicians
Tamil National Alliance politicians